The Decadary Cult or Tenth-day Cult was a semi-official religion of France during the Directory period of the French Revolution, intended to offer a non-Christian alternative after the dechristianisation of the country. It replaced the Christian Sunday worship with a quasi-religious festival on the day of rest in the 10-day week of the French Republican Calendar.

The Decadary Cult was a system of worship based on festivals, so-called , which were celebrated every , the day of rest in the 10-day week of the Republican calendar. In addition, there was a cycle of annual festivals, celebrating various themes such as youth, old age, the foundation of the French Republic and the execution of Louis XVI. The festivals included the singing of patriotic songs, banquets, games, and the  presentation of awards. The festivals were highly politicised, patriotic events, intended to promote Republican norms and values among the populace.

History 
The French revolutionary period saw a number of attempts to establish a quasi-official civil religion, despite the formal separation of state and religion enshrined in the 1795 Constitution of the Year III. These included Robespierre's Cult of the Supreme Being, the Cult of Reason and, during the later post-Terror period, the Decadary Cult and Theophilanthropy.

The  rose to popularity after the adoption of the Republican Calendar in October 1793. Jean-Baptiste Matthieu, a member of the Committee on Public Instruction, presented draft legislation which called for local celebrations throughout France on all 36  of the year.

The Decadary Cult was officially established by the laws of 17 Thermidor (4 August 1798), 3 Fructidor (20 August) and 23 Fructidor (9 September), and by decree of François de Neufchâteau on 20 Fructidor (6 September 1798). However, it soon became overtaken by Theophilanthropy, a deistic sect promoted by Louis Marie de La Révellière-Lépeaux which quickly gained popularity following the Coup of 18 Fructidor in 1797. After the Coup of 30 Prairial VII and De La Révellière's resignation from the Directory in 1799, Theophilanthropy fell from favour and there was a return to the original form of the Decadary Cult.

Napoleon Bonaparte's ascent to power with the Coup of 18 Brumaire and establishment of the Consulate in 1799 effectively ended the Decadary Cult, as Napoleon moved to re-establish the Roman Catholic Church in the years following, leading to the Concordat of 1801. A decree on 7 Thermidor of the Year VIII  (26 July 1800) ended the cult for French citizens; only government officials were still required to attend these events. The temples of the cult were deserted, and only two national holidays continued to be observed: 14 July (Bastille Day) and 1 Vendemiaire (New Year's Day in the Republican calendar). However, these were no longer used to promote Republican values. Napoleon abolished the Republican calendar in 1805.

References 

Religion and the French Revolution
Anti-Catholicism in France
French Republican calendar